The African Growth and Opportunity Act, or AGOA (Title I, Trade and Development Act of 2000; P.L. 106–200) is a piece of legislation that was approved by the U.S. Congress in May 2000. The stated purpose of this legislation is to assist the economies of sub-Saharan Africa and to improve economic relations between the United States and the region.
After completing its initial 15-year period of validity, the AGOA legislation was extended on 29 June 2015 by a further 10 years, to 2025.

History
The African Growth and Opportunity Act (AGOA) was the brainchild of Congressman Jim McDermott (a former Foreign Service medical officer based in Zaire), and his Chief of Staff, Michael Williams.  McDermott, along with Congressman Ed Royce, helped move the earliest versions of the legislation through Congress. Later, Rosa Whitaker, who served as the first ever Assistant U.S. Trade Representative (USTR) for Africa in the administrations of Presidents William J. Clinton and George W. Bush helped develop and implement the law. Passage of the legislation followed nearly a decade of leadership on the part of activists such as Paul Speck at Environmental and Energy Institute, Witney Schneidman, Steve Lande, Mel Foote, Tony Carroll, Claude Fontheim, and Mark Neuman, and others. AGOA was signed by President Clinton into law in May 2000. The legislation was reviewed again in 2015, and was renewed. The revisions made it easier to become eligible and focused on improving the future business environment in developing African countries.

In June 2015, the AGOA was extended for 10 years following contentious debate. While the longest extension of AGOA in its history provides tangible trade benefits for African producers, the scheduled expiration in 2025 makes the future of U.S.–Africa relations uncertain. In part, this is due to a changing trade environment with respect to Africa; for example, intracontinental and intercontinental economic integration have increased significantly. Similarly, following the conclusion of economic partnership agreements (EPAs) between the European Union (EU) and African, Caribbean, and Pacific (ACP) countries, trade ties are shifting from unilateral preferences to reciprocal relations. In order for African producers and manufacturers to become more fully integrated into supply chain networks, it may be beneficial to consider restructuring U.S.–Africa economic relations outside of the AGOA. The United States and sub-Saharan African countries have already discussed potential post-AGOA policy architectures.

Eligibility
The legislation authorized the President of the United States to determine which sub-Saharan African countries would be eligible for AGOA on an annual basis. The eligibility criteria were to improve labor rights and movement toward a market-based economy. Each year, the President evaluates the sub-Saharan African countries and determines which countries should remain eligible.

Countries' inclusion has fluctuated with changes in the local political environment.  In December 2009, for example, Guinea, Madagascar, and Niger were all removed from the list of eligible countries; by October 2011, though, eligibility was restored to Guinea and Niger, and by June 2014, to Madagascar as well. Notice was given that Burundi would lose its AGOA eligibility status as of 1 January 2016. In August, 2017, Togo was recognized as an eligible country.

Having AGOA eligibility does not imply automatic eligibility for a "Wearing Apparel" provision. To export apparel and certain textile to the United States under the AGOA duty-free, an eligible country must have implemented a "Visa System" that satisfies American authorities and proves compliance with the AGOA Rules of Origin.

On 1 January 2022, the United States removed Ethiopia, Mali and Guinea from the AGOA programme over alleged human rights violations and recent coups. In a statement the US Trade Representative explained the removal was “due to actions taken by each of their governments in violation of the AGOA Statute”. As of January 1, 2022, 36 countries are eligible to participate in AGOA.

Benefits and results 
AGOA provides trade preferences for quota and duty-free entry into the United States for certain goods, expanding the benefits under the Generalized System of Preferences (GSP) program. Notably, AGOA expanded market access for textile and apparel goods into the United States for eligible countries, though many other goods are also included. This resulted in the growth of an apparel industry in southern Africa, and created hundreds of thousands of jobs. However, the dismantling of the Multi Fibre Agreement's world quota regime for textile and apparel trade in January 2005 reversed some of the gains made in the African textile industry due to increased competition from developing nations outside of Africa, particularly China. Some factories shut down in Lesotho, where most of the growth occurred. Orders from African manufacturers stabilised somewhat after the imposition of certain safeguard measures by U.S. authorities, but Africa's share of the U.S. market was still reduced after the phaseout.

AGOA has resulted in limited successes in some countries. In addition to growth in the textile and apparel industry, some AGOA countries have begun to export new products to the United States, such as cut flowers, horticultural products, automotive components and steel. While Nigeria and Angola are the largest exporters under AGOA, other countries, particularly South Africa's have been more diverse and unlike the former are not mainly concentrated in the energy sector. To some countries, including Lesotho, Eswatini, Kenya and Madagascar, AGOA remains of critical importance. Agricultural products are a promising area for AGOA trade; however much work needs to be done to assist African countries in meeting U.S. sanitary and phytosanitary standards. The U.S. government is providing technical assistance to AGOA eligible countries to help them benefit from the legislation, through the U.S. Agency for International Development (USAID) and other agencies. The U.S. government has established three regional trade hubs in Africa for this purpose, in Accra, Ghana; Gaborone, Botswana; and Nairobi, Kenya.

Initially, AGOA was set to expire in 2008, but the United States Congress passed the AGOA Acceleration Act of 2004, which extended the legislation to 2015. It has since been extended by 10 years from 2015 to 2025. The Act's apparel special provision, which permits lesser-developed countries to use foreign fabric for their garment exports, was to expire in September 2007. However, legislation passed by Congress in December 2006 extended it through 2012, and later to 2025 as part of the general AGOA extension in June 2015.

Every year an AGOA Forum is held, which brings together government leaders and private sector stakeholders from Africa and the United States. The Forum is held in Washington every other year, and in an AGOA eligible African country in the other years. So far, the Forum has been held four times in Washington, and once each in Mauritius, Senegal, Ghana, Kenya (2009), Zambia (2011), Ethiopia  (2013), Gabon (2015) and Togo (2017).

Statistics suggest a positive balance of trade for AGOA participant countries. In FY2008, the United States exported $17,125,389 in goods to the 41 AGOA countries, and the U.S. imported $81,426,951 for a balance of $64,301,562 in favor of the AGOA countries.

Reception
Cameroonian scholar Tatah Mentan has criticized AGOA, arguing that while the legislation "sounds like a benevolent multilateral trade agreement", it is actually a neo-colonial scheme to further exploit African resources. Mentan has argued that despite promises of economic growth, the profits made from the scheme are "not for Africans". Sociologist Michael Mann has argued the legislation "exacts indirect imperial tribute" from African states, noting AGOA contains a clause requiring participating African countries not to oppose American foreign policy.

Some allege that AGOA is in contradiction with WTO rules. Furthermore, it is seen as a one-sided agreement as there was little African involvement in its preparation. AGOA has also been criticized for being "dominated by oil and raw materials" After the enactment of AGOA, "exports have increased by more than 500 per cent from around $8.2 billion then to $54 billion in 2011, although about 90 per cent of these are natural resources, mainly oil," wrote Andualem Sisay.

References

External links
 Complete resource on AGOA - news, legislation, trade data
 Agoa 2013: Oil 'too dominant' in trade deal with the US
 , Full text of the legislation

International development in Africa
United States foreign relations legislation
Acts of the 106th United States Congress
2000 in international relations
United States federal trade legislation
United States–African relations